Michel Sintzoff (12 August 1938 – 28 November 2010) was a Belgian mathematician and computer scientist.

He was one of the editors of the Revised Report on the Algorithmic Language Algol 68.

He was a member of the International Federation for Information Processing (IFIP) IFIP Working Group 2.1 on Algorithmic Languages and Calculi, which specified, maintains, and supports the programming languages ALGOL 60 and ALGOL 68.

He was also a member of IFIP Working Group 2.3 on Programming Methodology, of which he was chairperson from 2003–2006.

In 1981, he founded the journal Science of Computer Programming. Until 1999, he was editor-in-chief.

References

1938 births
2010 deaths